Esha Deol Takhtani (born 2 November 1981) is an Indian actress who predominantly appears in Hindi films. The daughter of actors Dharmendra and Hema Malini, Deol made her acting debut in Koi Mere Dil Se Poochhe (2002), which won her the Filmfare Award for Best Female Debut. Following a series of poorly received films, she played one of the leading ladies in the commercially successful films Dhoom (2004), Kaal, Dus, and No Entry (all 2005). This was followed by a setback and a hiatus. She returned to acting with the web series Rudra: The Edge of Darkness in 2022.

Early life

Esha Deol was born in Bombay (present Mumbai) on 2 November 1981. She is the elder daughter of Bollywood actors Dharmendra (Dharam Singh Deol) and Hema Malini. She has a younger sister named Ahana. She is the half sister of actors Sunny Deol and Bobby Deol and first cousin of actor Abhay Deol. Her father is Punjabi Jat, and her mother Tamil Hindu Iyengar Brahmin. She speaks Tamil with her mother and sister.

During her school days at Jamnabai Narsee School, she was passionate about football and played as a midfielder. She was the captain of her school football team, represented her college in handball at the state level. She played as a national level footballer and was also selected to play for Maharashtra in the Senior National Championship at Punjab in 2001. She then went on to attend Oxford University and obtained a master's degree in Media Arts and Computer Technology.

Career

Debut and early work (2002–2003)

She started her acting career in a lead role with Vinay Shukla's Koi Mere Dil Se Poochhe (2002) opposite Aftab Shivdasani, with Sanjay Kapoor, Jaya Bachchan and Anupam Kher playing supporting roles. The movie was a box office failure. Deol received mixed reactions from critics upon her performance. Savera R Someshwar of Rediff.com wrote "Esha, as a person, exudes a confidence that almost borders on arrogance." Rakesh Budhu of Planet Bollywood wrote "She isn't horrible, but given the hype, the demands and of course, comparisons, she surely isn't up to the mark. … Of course, she is nowhere close to being a washout and if you are her fan you can appreciate the other aspects of her performances without completely losing faith in her future projects." Despite mixed reactions and box office failure, Deol won numerous awards for her performance including the Filmfare Award for Best Female Debut at the 48th Filmfare Awards.

Deol's second film was Arjun Sablok's love triangle Na Tum Jaano Na Hum opposite Saif Ali Khan and Hrithik Roshan. Taran Adarsh of IndiaFm praised her acting and wrote "it is Esha Deol who surprises you with a mature performance. Although her looks are inconsistent, the youngster takes on the role with utmost sincerity and comes out with a natural performance. She has been better presented when compared to her debut film." Bhavna Giani of Rediff praised Deol's acting and dancing and compared it to Deol's mother Hema Malini. Deol's third and final release of the year was Sanjay Chhel's Kyaa Dil Ne Kahaa opposite Tusshar Kapoor. It was Deol's third consecutive flop but she earned critical acclaim and Taran Adarsh observed that it was her better performance as compared to her previous two films.

Deol's first two movies of 2003: Kucch To Hai and Chura Liyaa Hai Tumne were box office failures. For Kucch To Hai, Deol earned mixed reviews from Taran Adarsh, who wrote "Esha Deol shows improvement in terms of performance as well as her overall appearance." Taran Adarsh considered Deol to be "alright" in Chura Liyaa Hai Tumne.

Deol was one of the heroines of J.P. Dutta's multi starrer war epic LOC: Kargil and was paired with Abhishek Bachchan. Though Deol and all the other heroines could not get much scope, she earned critical acclaim for her performance. The film became the sixth highest-grossing film of the year.

Breakthrough and success (2004–2008)
In 2004, Deol made her debut in Tamil cinema by playing a French teacher in Mani Ratnam's political film Aayutha Ezhuthu opposite Suriya. She earned critical acclaim for her performance. Sify.com defined her as "surprisingly fresh and sparkling". To prepare for her role, Deol learned nuances of the language with Mani Ratnam's assistant R. Kannan. This was the only Tamil film she ever acted in. After completing Aaytha Ezhuthu, Deol started filming the Hindi version of the movie titled Yuva. In Yuva, Deol repeated the same role and was paired opposite Ajay Devgn. Both movies were released on the same date but could not attain success. Yuva had a below average opening and flopped at the box office.

Deol finally got her breakthrough with Yash Raj Films' action film Dhoom opposite Abhishek Bachchan, John Abraham, Uday Chopra and Rimi Sen. It was Deol's first action role and she was paired opposite Chopra. The film had a decent opening and became a hit at the box office, becoming the fourth-highest-grossing film of the year. Deol did not get much scope in the film, but her performance earned her a nomination for the IIFA Award for Best Supporting Actress at the 6th IIFA Awards. 

After the success of Dhoom, Deol starred in Krishna Vamsi's war film Insan opposite Akshay Kumar. It was Deol's first release of 2005. The film was a failure at the box office. Her next release was Main Aisa Hi Hoon opposite Ajay Devgn. The film was a remake of the Hollywood movie I Am Sam (2001). Deol played a supporting role and earned praise by Patcy N. Subhash K. Jha of IANS also praised Deol, writing: "Esha Deol as the fey unstable nomadic and maladjusted Maya is a mix of Zeenat Aman in Hare Rama Hare Krishna and Anooradha Patel in Ijaazat. Playing this zonked-out character Esha Deol comes into her own as an actress. Her far-way looks of pain, anger, neglect and insecurity remain with you long after the film. Yup she too has matured along with Hindi cinema."

In 2007, Deol's portrayal of a notorious and vengeful ghost for Ram Gopal Verma's Darling was reviewed positively. Her next release was Cash again opposite Ajay Devgn.

In 2008, she performed her first item number in Ajay Devgn film Sunday. She further appeared in Hijack and took a sabbatical break from films for two years.

Hiatus and return to acting (2011–present)
Deol's next film was Tell Me O Kkhuda (2011) directed and produced by her mother Hema Malini. She portrayed the lead role in the film opposite Arjan Bajwa, Vinod Khanna, Rishi Kapoor and her father Dharmendra. 

In February 2020, she announced her first book Amma Mia! on Instagram. This book is a hands-on guide on parenting and children diet.

Esha Deol released her short film Ek Duaa in which she acted and also produced alongside her husband. The film was released on voot, and it was met with mixed to positive reviews.

Esha will next be seen reuniting with Ajay Devgan in Rudra: The Edge of Darkness which will be a TV series released online. She will also be seen with Suniel Shetty in the series Invisible Woman.

Personal life

On 29 June 2012, Esha Deol married Bharat Takhtani in a low-key wedding ceremony at the ISKCON temple in Mumbai.

In April 2017, it was announced that the couple was expecting their first child. She gave birth to her daughter in October 2017 at Hinduja Hospital in Mumbai and named her Radhya. On 10 June 2019, she gave birth to her second daughter, Miraya.

Like their mother, Esha and her sister are trained in Bharatnatyam dance

Filmography

Films

Web series

Television

Awards and nominations

See also
 List of Indian film actresses
 List of Hindi film actresses

References

External links

 
 

1981 births
Living people
Indian film actresses
Indian web series actresses
Actresses from Mumbai
Indian female classical dancers
Performers of Indian classical dance
Actresses in Hindi cinema
Actresses in Tamil cinema
Actresses in Telugu cinema
Actresses in Kannada cinema
Mithibai College alumni
Filmfare Awards winners
Screen Awards winners
International Indian Film Academy Awards winners
Odissi exponents
Punjabi people
Indian Tamil people
21st-century Indian actresses